Hills in the Puget Lowland, between the Cascades and the Olympic Mountains, including the entire Seattle metropolitan area, are generally between  and rarely more than  above sea level. Hills are often notable geologically and for social reasons, such as the seven hills of Seattle.

Formation
The plateau, "the most prominent single landform of the entire region", was dissected by glacial outwash, forming present-day landforms: rivers, creeks and streams; glacial lakes such as Lake Washington; and numerous  kettle lakes, and Puget Sound itself. High points on the plateau remain, most of which are a drumlin (rocky glacial debris), or a bedrock intrusion that predated glaciation. Hills above 500 feet are considered exceptional.

Notable lowlands hills
Hills are glacial deposits unless otherwise noted. King, Pierce and Snohomish Counties run up to the crest of the Cascades where their high points reside; therefore, the Cascades and attached foothills are excluded. Likewise for Thurston County in the Mount Rainier area, and Mason County's Olympic Mountains foothills.

North Sound
Landforms north of the Tacoma Narrows (Island, King, Kitsap, Pierce and Snohomish counties)

Island County
Whidbey Island and Camano Island are islands in Puget Sound and form the bulk of Island County.
Whidbey Island high point,  unnamed peak 500 meters from Naval Air Station Whidbey Island
Camano Island high point,  unnamed peak, the lowest high point of any Washington county

King County
Finn Hill,  altitude
Rose Hill; Forbes Creek origin, Kirkland's high point (also see Bridle Trails State Park)
Novelty Hill, Redmond's high point at  

Seattle
High Point, West Seattle, the highest point in the city at 
Seven hills of Seattle
First Hill, nicknamed "Pill Hill" because of the many hospitals and clinics located there
Yesler Hill
Renton Hill
Denny Hill – regraded, now called the Denny Regrade
Capitol Hill
Queen Anne Hill
Beacon Hill

Kitsap County

The Blue Hills of the Kitsap Peninsula are unusual in that they are composed of basalt bedrock, not glacial till.
Gold Mountain,  (Kitsap County h.p. & city of Bremerton watershed on mountain contains city h.p.)
Green Mountain, 

Bainbridge Island is an island in Puget Sound.
Toe Jam Hill, Bainbridge Island's high point,

Pierce County
South Hill above Puyallup, 
Argonne Forest hills at Fort Lewis, formed of multiple layers of till deposited during Vashon glaciation; some hills may overlie drumlins from an earlier glacial phase. Hills are designated critical habitat for the Northern Spotted Owl, an endangered species whose forest habitat in the Puget Lowland has been largely destroyed.
Black Hill 502 ft.
Heaton Hill 423 ft.
Kelly Hill 458 ft.
Starr Hill 463–467 ft.

Snohomish County
Bald Hill, 
Lake Serene Hill, Lynnwood 
Clearview Hill,  altitude

South Puget Sound
Landforms in South Puget Sound (Thurston and Mason counties)
Black Hills, southwest of Olympia, basalt bedrock, high point . Bedrock comes to shore of Puget Sound at Mud Bay.
Kamilche Hill , Mason County above Little Skookum Inlet

Low mountains
The Issaquah Alps Bellevue, Issaquah and Newcastle on the Eastside are considered part of the Cascades foothills by many authors. They are basalt intrusions possibly related to the Blue Hills of the Kitsap Peninsula. Highest point Tiger Mountain summit, .

Mason County's Olympic Mountains foothills are called the Satsop Hills.

See also
List of highest points in Washington by county
List of mountain peaks of Washington (state)

Footnotes

References

Sources
 (PDF from UW)

 List maintained at Peakbagger.com

 – 1941 original hand-penned map, 1965 third revision

Hills of Washington (state)
Landforms of Puget Sound
Lists of landforms of Washington (state)